The Shapley Supercluster or Shapley Concentration (SCl 124) is the largest concentration of galaxies in our nearby universe that forms a gravitationally interacting unit, thereby pulling itself together instead of expanding with the universe. It appears as a striking overdensity in the distribution of galaxies in the constellation of Centaurus. It is 650 million light-years away (z=0.046).

History 
In 1930, Harlow Shapley and his colleagues at the Harvard College Observatory started a survey of galaxies in the southern sky, using photographic plates obtained at the 24-inch Bruce telescope at Bloemfontein, South Africa. By 1932, Shapley reported the discovery of 76,000 galaxies brighter than 18th apparent magnitude in a third of the southern sky, based on galaxy counts from his plates. Some of this data was later published as part of the Harvard galaxy counts, intended to map galactic obscuration and to find the space density of galaxies.

In this catalog, Shapley could see most of the 'Coma-Virgo cloud' (now known to be a superposition of the Coma Supercluster and the Virgo Supercluster), but found a 'cloud' in the constellation of Centaurus to be the most striking concentration of galaxies. He found it particularly interesting because of its "great linear dimension, the numerous population and distinctly elongated form". This can be identified with what we now know as the core of the Shapley Supercluster. Shapley estimated the distance to this cloud to be 14 times that to the Virgo Cluster, from the average diameters of the galaxies. This would place the Shapley Supercluster at a distance of 231 Mpc, based on the current estimate of the distance to Virgo.

In recent times, the Shapley Supercluster was named by Somak Raychaudhury, from a survey of galaxies from UK Schmidt Telescope Sky survey plates, using the Automated Plate Measuring Facility (APM) at the University of Cambridge in England. In this paper, the supercluster was named after Harlow Shapley, in recognition of his pioneering survey of galaxies in which this concentration of galaxies was first seen. Around the same time, Roberto Scaramella and co-workers had also noticed the Shapley Supercluster in the Abell catalogue of clusters of galaxies: they had named it the Alpha concentration.

Current interest 
The Shapley Supercluster lies very close to the direction in which the Local Group of galaxies (including our galaxy) is moving with respect to the cosmic microwave background (CMB) frame of reference. This has led many to speculate that the Shapley Supercluster may indeed be one of the major causes of our galaxy's peculiar motion—the Great Attractor may be another—and has led to a surge of interest in this supercluster. It has been found that the Great Attractor and all the galaxies in our region of the universe (including our galaxy, the Milky Way) are moving toward the Shapley Supercluster.

In 2017 it was proposed that the movement towards attractors like the Shapley Attractor in the supercluster creates a relative movement away from underdense areas, that may be visualized as a virtual repeller. This approach enables new ways of understanding and modelling variations in galactic movements. The nearest large underdense area has been labelled the dipole repeller.

See also

References

External links
 Shapley Supercluster at Atlas of the Universe
 
 Harvard College Observatory (HCO) 
 
 
 

 
Great Attractor
Centaurus (constellation)
Galaxy superclusters